Agrostophyllum philippinense is a species of orchid in the genus Agrostophyllum that was first described by Oakes Ames in 1910. It is endemic to the Philippines.

References

philippinense
Plants described in 1910
Orchids of the Philippines